The Ta-Arawakan languages, also known as Ta-Maipurean and Caribbean, are the indigenous Arawakan languages of the Caribbean Sea coasts of Central and South America. They are distinguished by the first person pronominal prefix ta-, as opposed to common Arawakan na-.

Languages
Kaufman (1994) provides the following subclassification:
 Taíno
 Guajiro (Wahiro)
Wayuu (Guajiro, Wahiro)
 Paraujano (Parauhano, Añun) (†)
 Arawák (Lokono)
 Iñeri (Inyeri)
Kalhíphona (Island Carib, modern Garífuna or Black Carib)

Aikhenvald adds Shebayo, which Kaufman had left unclassified, and removes Iñeri from Ta-Arawakan proper:

Caribbean Arawakan
 Iñeri
Kalhíphona
 Ta-Arawakan
Taíno
 Wayuu
 Parauhano
 Arawák
 Shebayo
 Caquetio

Proto-language
Reconstructions of Proto-Lokono-Guajiro proposed by Captain (1991):

{| class="wikitable sortable"
! no. !! gloss !! Proto Lokono-Guajiro
|-
| 1. || ‘abdomen’ || *Vteke
|-
| 2. || ‘after’ || *dikʰi
|-
| 3. || ‘ant’ || *hayu
|-
| 4. || ‘anteater’ || *waRiti
|-
| 5. || ‘arm’ || *dɨna
|-
| 6. || ‘armadillo’ || *yekerV
|-
| 7. || ‘arrow’ || *kimařa
|-
| 8. || ‘ash’ || *baliki
|-
| 9. || ‘ask’ || *asa (?)
|-
| 10. || ‘axe’ || *bařu
|-
| 11. || ‘back’ || *asabu
|-
| 12. || ‘bat’ || *busiri
|-
| 13. || ‘bathe’ || *aka
|-
| 14. || ‘beard’ || *tiima
|-
| 15. || ‘bird’ || *kudibiu
|-
| 16. || ‘blood’ || *itʰa
|-
| 17. || ‘bone’ || *Vbu-na
|-
| 18. || ‘breast’ || *(u)di
|-
| 19. || ‘break’ || *wakVdV-
|-
| 20. || ‘by (agent)’ || *duma
|-
| 21. || ‘cane’ || *isi
|-
| 22. || ‘canoe’ || *kanuwa
|-
| 23. || ‘chest’ || *Vluwa
|-
| 24. || ‘child’ || *(?)ibili
|-
| 25. || ‘chili pepper’ || *hatʰi
|-
| 26. || ‘chop’ || *lada
|-
| 27. || ‘cold, have a || *tʰunuli-
|-
| 28. || ‘come’ || *andV
|-
| 29. || ‘cricket’ || *pʰuti
|-
| 30. || ‘crocodile’ || *kayukutʰi
|-
| 31. || ‘delicious’ || *keme-
|-
| 32. || ‘down’ || *unabu
|-
| 33. || ‘drink (v)’ || *VtʰV
|-
| 34. || ‘ear’ || *dike
|-
| 35. || ‘egret’ || *wakaRa
|-
| 36. || ‘eye’ || *aku
|-
| 37. || ‘exit (v)’ || *apʰuti-
|-
| 38. || ‘fat, grease’ || *akusi
|-
| 39. || ‘father’ || *Vtʰi
|-
| 40. || ‘finger’ || *kʰabu-ibira
|-
| 41. || ‘fingernail’ || *bada
|-
| 42. || ‘fire’ || *sikʰi
|-
| 43. || ‘fish’ || *hime
|-
| 44. || ‘flea’ || *kʰayaba
|-
| 45. || ‘flesh’ || *kiruku
|-
| 46. || ‘flower’ || *siwi
|-
| 47. || ‘fly’ || *mabuRi
|-
| 48. || ‘foot’ || *ukuti
|-
| 49. || ‘for (benefactive)’ || *bura
|-
| 50. || ‘forehead’ || *kibu
|-
| 51 || ‘from (LOC)’ || *-kee
|-
| 52. || ‘fur’ || *Vti
|-
| 53. || ‘go’ || *kuna
|-
| 54. || ‘gourd’ || *iwida
|-
| 55. || ‘grandfather’ || *dukutʰi
|-
| 56. || ‘grandmother’ || *kVtʰV
|-
| 57. || ‘green’ || *subule
|-
| 58. || ‘hair’ || *Vbařa
|-
| 59. || ‘hammock’ || *hamaka; *kura
|-
| 60. || ‘hand’ || *kʰabu
|-
| 61. || ‘hate, be hated’ || *te-
|-
| 62. || ‘head’ || *ikiwi
|-
| 63. || ‘hear’ || *akanaba
|-
| 64. || ‘here’ || *yaha
|-
| 65. || ‘honey’ || *maba
|-
| 66. || ‘horn’ || *ukuwa
|-
| 67. || ‘house’ || *bahɨ
|-
| 68. || ‘I’ || *dakia
|-
| 69. || ‘iguana’ || *iwana
|-
| 70. || ‘in’ || *luku
|-
| 71 || ‘in (a fluid)’ || *raku
|-
| 72. || ‘juice’ || *Vra
|-
| 73. || ‘kill’ || *pʰarV
|-
| 74. || ‘knife’ || *ruři
|-
| 75. || ‘leaf || *bana
|-
| 76. || ‘liver’ || *bana
|-
| 77. || ‘maize’ || *mariki
|-
| 78. || ‘manioc’ || *kʰali
|-
| 79. || ‘manioc starch’ || *hařo
|-
| 80. || ‘many’ || *yuhu
|-
| 81. || ‘monkey’ || *pʰudi
|-
| 82. || ‘moon’ || *katʰi
|-
| 83. || ‘mosquito’ || *maRi
|-
| 84. || ‘mother’ || *uyu
|-
| 85. || ‘neck’ || *nuru
|-
| 86. || ‘nose’ || *kiri
|-
| 87. || ‘one’ || *aba
|-
| 88. || ‘path’ || *bɨna; *wabu
|-
| 89. || ‘peck’ || *tuka-
|-
| 90. || ‘penis’ || *ewera
|-
| 91. || ‘rat’ || *kuři
|-
| 92. || ‘raw’ || *iya
|-
| 93. || ‘request’ || *kʰuyabV-
|-
| 94. || ‘resin’ || *Vkʰɨ
|-
| 95. || ‘ripe’ || *hebe
|-
| 96. || ‘river’ || *sVři
|-
| 97. || ‘root’ || *akura
|-
| 98. || ‘say’ || *akV
|-
| 99. || ‘sea’ || *bařawa
|-
| 100. || ‘seat, stool’ || *turu
|-
| 101. || ‘she’ || *tʰukia
|-
| 102. || ‘skin’ || *Vda
|-
| 103. || ‘sleep’ || *dunkV
|-
| 104. || ‘snake’ || *uri
|-
| 105. || ‘son-in-law’ || *titʰi
|-
| 106. || ‘sound’ || *akanVkɨ
|-
| 107. || ‘star’ || *iwiwa
|-
| 108. || ‘stone’ || *kiba
|-
| 109. || ‘stop’ || *takɨ-
|-
| 110. || ‘sweet potato’ || *halitʰi
|-
| 111. || ‘tail’ || *isi
|-
| 112. || ‘tapir’ || *kama
|-
| 113. || ‘termite’ || *kʰumutʰiri
|-
| 114. || ‘that (masculine)’ || *lira
|-
| 115. || ‘that (non-masculine)’ || *tura
|-
| 116. || ‘there’ || *yara
|-
| 117. || ‘they’ || *nakia
|-
| 118. || ‘thigh’ || *(N)bɨku
|-
| 119. || ‘this (masculine)’ || *lihi
|-
| 120. || ‘this (non-masculine)’ || *tuhu
|-
| 121. || ‘thou’ || *bukia
|-
| 122. || ‘three’ || *kabɨnV
|-
| 123. || ‘tip’ || *kiruku
|-
| 124. || ‘toad’ || *kiberu
|-
| 125. || ‘tobacco’ || *yuři
|-
| 126. || ‘tongue’ || *Vyee
|-
| 127. || ‘tooth’ || *ari
|-
| 128. || ‘touch, feel’ || *bebeda
|-
| 129. || ‘tree’ || *kunuku
|-
| 130. || ‘two’ || *biama
|-
| 131. || ‘up’ || *iu-
|-
| 132. || ‘vomit’ || *ewedV
|-
| 133. || ‘water’ || *uni
|-
| 134. || ‘we’ || *wakia
|-
| 135. || ‘with (accomp.)’ || *Vma
|-
| 136. || ‘whistle’ || *wiwida-
|-
| 137. || ‘woman’ || *hiaru
|-
| 138. || ‘worm’ || *-koma-
|-
| 139. || ‘ye’ || *hukia
|-
| 140. || ‘yes’ || *VNhVN
|-
| 141. || (absolutive) || *-hV
|-
| 142. || (poss. suffix) || *-tʰe
|}

References

Arawakan languages
Languages of the Caribbean
Languages of Central America
Languages of Belize
Languages of Honduras
Languages of Guatemala